Parma is a city in the northern Italian region of Emilia-Romagna known for its architecture, music, art, prosciutto (ham), cheese and surrounding countryside. With a population of 198,292 inhabitants, Parma is the second most populous city in Emilia-Romagna after Bologna, the region's capital. The city is home to the University of Parma, one of the oldest universities in the world. Parma is divided into two parts by the stream of the same name. The district on the far side of the river is Oltretorrente. Parma's Etruscan name was adapted by Romans to describe the round shield called Parma.

The Italian poet Attilio Bertolucci (born in a hamlet in the countryside) wrote: "As a capital city it had to have a river. As a little capital it received a stream, which is often dry", with reference to the time when the city was capital of the independent Duchy of Parma.

History

Prehistory
Parma was already a built-up area in the Bronze Age. In the current position of the city rose a terramare. The "terramare" (marl earth) were ancient villages built of wood on piles according to a defined scheme and squared form; constructed on dry land and generally in proximity to the rivers. During this age (between 1500 BC and 800 BC) the first necropolis (on the sites of the present-day Piazza Duomo and Piazzale della Macina) were constructed.

Antiquity
The city was most probably founded and named by the Etruscans, for a parma or palma (circular shield) was a Latin borrowing, as were many Roman terms for particular arms, and the names Parmeal, Parmni and Parmnial appear in Etruscan inscriptions. Diodorus Siculus reported that the Romans had changed their rectangular shields for round ones, imitating the Etruscans. Whether the Etruscan encampment acquired its name from its round shape, like a shield, or from its metaphorical function as a shield against the Gauls to the north, remains uncertain.

The Roman colony was founded in 183 BC, together with Mutina (Modena); 2,000 families were settled. Parma had a certain importance as a road hub over the Via Aemilia and the Via Claudia. It had a forum, in what is today the central Garibaldi Square. In April 43 BC the city was destroyed. Subsequently Augustus rebuilt it. During the Roman Empire, it gained the title of Julia for its loyalty to the imperial house.

Attila sacked the city in 452,
and the Germanic king Odoacer later gifted it to his followers. During the Gothic War, however, Totila destroyed it. It was then part of the Byzantine Exarchate of Ravenna (changing its name to Chrysopolis, "Golden City", probably due to the presence of the imperial treasury) and, from 569, of the Lombard Kingdom of Italy. During the Middle Ages, Parma became an important stage of the Via Francigena, the main road connecting Rome to Northern Europe; several castles, hospitals and inns were built in the following centuries to host the increasing number of pilgrims who passed by Parma and Fidenza, following the Apennines via Collecchio, Berceto and the Corchia ranges before descending the Passo della Cisa into Tuscany, heading finally south toward Rome.

The city had a medieval Jewish community. The Palatine Library houses the largest collection of Hebrew manuscripts in Italy, and the second-largest in the world after the Bodleian Library in Oxford.

Middle Ages

Under Frankish rule, Parma became the capital of a county in 774. Like most northern Italian cities, it was nominally a part of the Holy Roman Empire created by Charlemagne, but locally ruled by its bishops, the first being Guibodus. In the subsequent struggles between the Papacy and the Empire, Parma was usually a member of the Imperial party. Two of its bishops became antipopes: Càdalo, founder of the cathedral, as Honorius II; and Guibert, as Clement III. An almost independent commune was created around 1140; a treaty between Parma and Piacenza of 1149 is the earliest document of a comune headed by consuls. After the Peace of Constance in 1183  confirmed the Italian communes' rights of self-governance, long-standing quarrels with the neighbouring communes of Reggio Emilia, Piacenza and Cremona became harsher, with the aim of controlling the vital trading line over the Po River.

The struggle between Guelphs and Ghibellines was a feature of Parma too. In 1213, her podestà was the Guelph Rambertino Buvalelli. Then, after a long stance alongside the emperors, the Papist families of the city gained control in 1248. The city was besieged in 1247–48 by Emperor Frederick II, who was however crushed in the battle that ensued.

By 1328, Rolando de' Rossi was made signore of Parma. In 1331, the city submitted to King John of Bohemia. Parma fell under the control of Milan in 1341. After a short-lived period of independence under the Terzi family (1404–1409), the Sforza imposed their rule (1440–1449) through their associated families of Pallavicino, Rossi, Sanvitale and Da Correggio. These created a kind of new feudalism, building towers and castles throughout the city and the land. These fiefs evolved into truly independent states: the Landi governed the higher Taro's valley from 1257 to 1682. The Pallavicino seignory extended over the eastern part of today's province, with the capital in Busseto. Parma's territories were an exception for Northern Italy, as its feudal subdivision frequently continued until more recent years. For example, Solignano was a Pallavicino family possession until 1805, and San Secondo belonged to the Rossi well into the 19th century.

Modern era

Between the 14th and the 15th centuries, Parma was at the centre of the Italian Wars. The Battle of Fornovo was fought in its territory. The French held the city in 1500–1521, with a short Papal parenthesis in 1512–1515. After the foreigners were expelled, Parma belonged to the Papal States until 1545.

In that year the Farnese pope, Paul III, detached Parma and Piacenza from the Papal States and gave them as a duchy to his illegitimate son, Pier Luigi Farnese, whose descendants ruled in Parma until 1731, when Antonio Farnese, last male of the Farnese line, died. In 1594 a constitution was promulgated, the University enhanced and the Nobles' College founded. The war to reduce the barons' power continued for several years: in 1612 Barbara Sanseverino was executed in the central square of Parma, together with six other nobles charged of plotting against the duke. At the end of the 17th century, after the defeat of Pallavicini (1588) and Landi (1682) the Farnese duke could finally hold with firm hand all Parmense territories. The castle of the Sanseverino in Colorno was turned into a luxurious summer palace by Ferdinando Bibiena.

In the Treaty of London (1718) it was promulgated that the heir to the combined Duchy of Parma and Piacenza would be Elisabeth Farnese's elder son with Philip V of Spain, Don Carlos. In 1731, the fifteen-year-old Don Carlos became Charles I Duke of Parma and Piacenza, at the death of his childless great uncle Antonio Farnese. In 1734, Charles I conquered the kingdoms of Naples and Sicily, and was crowned as the King of Naples and Sicily on 3 July 1735, leaving the Duchy of Parma to his brother Philip (Filippo I di Borbone-Parma). All the outstanding art collections of the duke's palaces of Parma, Colorno and Sala Baganza were moved to Naples.

Parma was under French influence after the Peace of Aachen (1748). Parma became a modern state with the energetic action of prime minister Guillaume du Tillot. He created the bases for a modern industry and fought strenuously against the church's privileges. The city lived a period of particular splendour: the Biblioteca Palatina (Palatine Library), the Archaeological Museum, the Picture Gallery and the Botanical Garden were founded, together with the Royal Printing Works directed by Giambattista Bodoni, aided by the Amoretti Brothers as skilled and inspired punchcutters.

Contemporary age

During the Napoleonic Wars (1802–1814), Parma was annexed to France and made capital of the Taro Department. Under its French name, Parme, it was also created a duché grand-fief de l'Empire for Charles-François Lebrun, duc de Plaisance, the Emperor's Arch-Treasurer, on 24 April 1808 (extinguished in 1926).

After the restoration of the Duchy of Parma by the 1814–15 Vienna Congress, the Risorgimento's upheavals had no fertile ground in the tranquil duchy. In 1847, after Marie Louise, Duchess of Parma's death, it passed again to the House of Bourbon, the last of whom was stabbed in the city and left it to his widow, Luisa Maria of Berry. On 15 September 1859 the dynasty was declared deposed, and Parma entered the newly formed province of Emilia under Luigi Carlo Farini. With the plebiscite of 1860 the former duchy became part of the unified Kingdom of Italy.

The loss of the capital role provoked an economic and social crisis in Parma. It started to recover its role of industrial prominence after the railway connection with Piacenza and Bologna of 1859, and with Fornovo and Suzzara in 1883. Trade unions were strong in the city, in which a notable General Strike was declared from 1 May to 6 June 1908. The struggle with Fascism had its most dramatic moment in August 1922, when the regime officer Italo Balbo attempted to enter the popular quarter of Oltretorrente. The citizens organized into the Arditi del Popolo ("People's champions") and pushed back the squadristi. This episode is considered the first example of Resistance in Italy.

During World War II, Parma was a strong centre of partisan resistance. The train station and marshalling yards were targets for high altitude bombing by the Allies in the spring of 1944. Much of the Palazzo della Pilotta, situated not far (half a mile) from the train station, was destroyed. Along with it the Teatro Farnese and part of the Biblioteca Palatina were destroyed by Allied bombs; some 21,000 volumes of the library's collection were lost. Several other monuments were also damaged: Palazzo del Giardino, Steccata and San Giovanni churches, Palazzo Ducale, Paganini theater and the monument to Verdi. However, Parma did not see widespread destruction during the war. Parma was liberated from the German occupation (1943–1945) on 26 April 1945 by the partisan resistance and the Brazilian Expeditionary Force.

Geography

Climate 

The following data comes from the weather station located at the university in the city center. It is affected by the urban heat island phenomenon. Parma has a mid-latitude, four-season humid subtropical climate (Köppen: Cfa) with heavy continental influences due to the city's inland position. Relatively nearby coastal areas like Genoa have far milder climates with cooler summers and milder winters, with the mountains separating Parma from the Mediterranean Sea acting as a barrier to the sea air. The city receives approximately 45 cm of snow each winter.

Main sights

Churches
Parma Cathedral: Romanesque church houses a 12th-century sculpture by Benedetto Antelami and a 16th-century fresco masterpiece by Antonio da Correggio.
Baptistery: construction began in 1196 by Antelami, stands adjacent to the cathedral.
San Giovanni Evangelista: Abbey church originally constructed in the 10th century behind the Cathedral's apse, rebuilt in 1498 and 1510. It has a late Mannerist façade and a bell tower designed by Simone Moschino. The cupola is frescoed with an influential masterpiece of the Renaissance:  the Vision of St. John the Evangelist (1520–1522) by Correggio which heralded illusionistic perspective ceilings. Cloisters and library are also notable.
Sanctuary of Santa Maria della Steccata.
Sant'Uldarico, Parma (1411).
San Paolo, Parma: (11th century): Former Benedictine convent houses Correggio's frescoes in the Camera di San Paolo (1519–1520), and works by Alessandro Araldi.
San Francesco del Prato: (13th century) Gothic church served as jail from Napoleonic era until 1990s, during which the 16 windows in the façade were opened. The Oratory of the Concezione houses frescoes by Michelangelo Anselmi and Francesco Rondani. 
Santa Croce: 12th-century church in Romanesque style, had a nave and two aisles with a semicircular apse. Rebuilt in 1415 and again in 1635–1666. The frescoes in the nave by Giovanni Maria Conti, Francesco Reti and Antonio Lombardi) date to this period.
San Sepolcro: church built in 1275 over a pre-existing religious building. Interiors were largely renovated in 1506, 1603 and finally 1701. The Baroque bell tower was built in 1616 and the bells were completed in 1753. Adjacent is a former monastery (1493–1495) of the Regular Canons of the Lateran.
Santa Caterina d'Alessandria: 14th-century church.
Santa Maria del Quartiere (1604–1619) church characterized by an unusual hexagonal plan. The cupola is decorated with frescoes by Pier Antonio Bernabei and pupils.
San Rocco: late Baroque style church rebuilt in 1754 and dedicated to one of Parma's patron saints.
Santa Cristina

Palaces
 Palazzo della Pilotta (1583): it houses the Academy of Fine Arts with artists of the School of Parma, the Palatine Library, the National Gallery, the Archaeological Museum, the Bodoni Museum and the Farnese Theatre. It was partially destroyed during World War II
Palazzo del Giardino, built from 1561 for Duke Ottavio Farnese on a design by Jacopo Barozzi da Vignola. Built on the former Sforza castle area, it was enlarged in the 17th–18th centuries. It includes the Palazzo Eucherio Sanvitale, with interesting decorations dating from the 16th centuries and attributed to Gianfrancesco d'Agrate, and a fresco by Parmigianino. Annexed is the Ducal Park also by Vignola. It was turned into a French-style garden in 1749.
Palazzo del Comune, built in 1627.
Palazzo del Governatore ("Governor's Palace"), dating from the 13th century.
Bishop's Palace (1055).
Ospedale Vecchio ("Old Hospital"), created in 1250 and later renovated in Renaissance times.

Other sites of interest
 The Teatro Farnese was constructed in 1618–1619 by Giovan Battista Aleotti, totally in wood. It was commissioned by  Duke Ranuccio I for the visit of Cosimo I de' Medici.
The Cittadella, a large fortress erected in the 16th century by order of Duke Alessandro Farnese, close to the old walls.
The Pons Lapidis (also known as Roman Bridge or Theoderic's Bridge), a Roman structure in stone dating from the reign of  Augustus.
 The Orto Botanico di Parma is a botanical garden maintained by the University of Parma.
 The Teatro Regio ("Royal Theatre"), built in 1821–1829 by Nicola Bettoli. It has a Neo-Classical façade and a porch with double window order. It is the city's opera house.
 The Auditorium Niccolò Paganini, designed by Renzo Piano.
 The Museum House of Arturo Toscanini, where the musician was born.
Museo Lombardi. It exhibits a prestigious collection of art and historical items regarding Maria Luigia of Habsburg and her first husband Napoleon Bonaparte; important works and documents concerning the Duchy of Parma in the 18th and 19th centuries are also kept by the Museum.

Demographics

On 1 January 2016 there were 192,836 resident citizens in Parma, of whom 47.64% were male and 52.36% were female. Minors (children aged 18 and younger) totalled 16.46% of the population compared to pensioners who numbered 22.64%. This compares with the Italian average of 17.45% and 22.04% respectively. In the fourteen years between 2002 and 2016, the population of Parma experienced 17.72% growth, while Italy as a whole grew by 6.45%. In the same period foreign born residents in Parma experienced +385.02% growth, while in Italy growth was of +274.75%.  The current birth rate of Parma is 8.62 births per 1,000 inhabitants compared to the Italian average of 8.01 births.

, 84.09% of the population was Italian. The largest foreign group came from other parts of Europe (namely Moldova, Romania, Albania, and Ukraine: 6.45%), followed by Sub-Saharan Africa (namely Ghana, Nigeria and Ivory Coast: 1.81%), North Africa (namely Morocco and Tunisia: 1.46%) and the Philippines: 1.33%.

Culture

Food and cuisine

Parma is famous for its food and rich gastronomical tradition: two of its specialties are Parmigiano Reggiano cheese (also produced in Reggio Emilia), and Prosciutto di Parma (Parma ham), both given Protected Designation of Origin status. Parma also claims several stuffed pasta dishes such as "tortelli d'erbetta" and "anolini in brodo".

In 2004 Parma was appointed the seat of the European Food Safety Authority (EFSA) and was appointed to the Creative Cities Network as UNESCO City of Gastronomy.
Parma also has two food multinationals, Barilla and Parmalat and a medium-large food tourism sector represented by Parma Golosa and Food Valley companies.

Frazioni
The comune (municipality) of Parma is subdivided into a number of frazioni:
Alberi, Baganzola, Beneceto, Botteghino, Ca'Terzi, Calestano, Carignano, Carpaneto, Cartiera, Casalbaroncolo, Casalora di Ravadese, Casaltone, Case Capelli, Case Cocconi, Case Crostolo, Case Nuove, Case Rosse, Case Vecchie, Casino dalla Rosa, Casagnola, Castelletto, Castelnovo, Cervara, Chiozzola, Coloreto, Colorno, Corcagnano, Eia, Fontanini, Fontanellato, Gaione, Ghiaiata Nuova, Il Moro, La Catena, La Palazzina, Malandriano, Marano, Marore, Martorano, Molino di Malandriano, Osteria San Martino, Panocchia, Paradigna, Pedrignano, Pilastrello, Pizzolese, Ponte, Porporano, Pozzetto Piccolo, Quercioli, Ravadese, Ronco Pascolo, Rosa, San Pancrazio, San Prospero, San Ruffino, San Secondo, Sissa, Soragna, Terenzo, Tizzano Val Parma, Traversetolo, Trecasali, Valera, Viarolo, Viazza, Vicofertile, Vicomero, Vigatto, Vigheffio, Vigolante.

Notable people

Painters and sculptors
 Michelangelo Anselmi, painter born in Tuscany
 Benedetto Antelami, architect and sculptor
 Alessandro Araldi, painter
 Sisto Badalocchio, painter
 Jacopo Bertoia (Giacomo Zanguidi or Jacopo Zanguidi or Bertoja), painter
 Amedeo Bocchi, painter
 Giulio Carmignani, painter
 Antonio da Correggio (Antonio Allegri), born in Correggio (Reggio Emilia), painter

 Francesco Marmitta, painter
 Filippo Mazzola, painter
 Francesco Mazzola, best known as Il Parmigianino, painter
 Girolamo Mazzola Bedoli, painter
 Giovanni Maria Francesco Rondani, painter
 Bartolomeo Schedoni, painter

Others
 Vittorio Adorni, cyclist
 Deborah Lettieri, dancer at Crazy Horse de Paris, choreographer, tv talent show judge
 Giovanni Amighetti, composer, musician
 Amoretti Brothers, typographers and typefounders, Bodoni's opponents
 Attilio Bertolucci, poet
 Bernardo Bertolucci, director
 Giuseppe Bertolucci, director
 Giacomo Belli, Musician
 Giambattista Bodoni, typographer
 Vittorio Bottego, explorer
 Cleofonte Campanini, conductor
 Francesco Cura, actor, singer, model
 Alex Di Gregorio, cartoonist
 Elizabeth Farnese, Queen of Spain
 Odoardo Farnese, duke of Parma
 Alexander Farnese, Duke of Parma, military commander
 Adalgisa Gabbi (1857–1933), opera singer
 Francesco Gabriele Frola, ballet dancer
 Vittorio Gallese, physiologist
 Fiorello Giraud, opera singer
 Giovannino Guareschi, writer
 Adriano Malori, cyclist
 Franco Nero, actor
 Antonio Brianti, architect
 Ferdinando Paer, composer
 Niccolò Paganini, composer, musician (buried in Parma)
 Alex Szilasi, pianist 
 Arturo Toscanini, conductor
 Paul Yeboah (Bello FiGo), singer 
 Giuseppe Verdi, opera composer

Sport

Parma Calcio 1913, founded in 2015, is a Serie B (second division) football club. It replaced Parma F.C., which went bankrupt in 2015. It plays in the city's Stadio Ennio Tardini, which opened in 1923 and seats up to 23,000.

Parma's other sport team is the rugby union club Zebre which competes in Pro14, one of the top rugby competitions in the world. Parma also is home to two rugby union teams in the top national division, Overmach Rugby Parma and SKG Gran Rugby.

Parma Panthers is the Parma American football team which provided the basis for  John Grisham's book Playing for Pizza. Stadio Sergio Lanfranchi is the ground of rugby and American football teams.

Pallavolo Parma and Parma Baseball are other sports teams in the city. Nino Cavalli Stadium is a baseball stadium located in Parma. It is the home stadium of Parma Baseball of the Italian Baseball League.

Economy and infrastructure 
Parma has a thriving economy, and the food sector is very developed. Some of the players in this sector include Barilla which is based in 
the city. Chiesi Farmaceutici in the pharma industry is headquartered in Parma.  The European Food Safety Authority is also based in Parma.

Transport

Parma railway station is on the Milan–Bologna railway system.

The Parma trolleybus system has been in operation since 1953. It replaced an earlier tramway network, and presently comprises four trolleybus routes.

Aeroporto Internazionale di Parma, Parma's airport, offers commercial flights to cities in a number of European countries.

Twin towns – sister cities

Parma is twinned with:

 Bourg-en-Bresse, France
 Ljubljana, Slovenia
 Shijiazhuang, China
 Szeged, Hungary
 Tours, France
 Worms, Germany
 Stockton, United States

See also
 European College of Parma
 University of Parma

References

Bibliography

External links
 Live-streaming webcam on Garibaldi Square
 Parma's view from satellite (Google Earth)
 360° photos of City of Parma
 Video Introduction to Parma and the Parmigiano Reggiano
 Video Brief History of Parma
The European Food Safety Authority Website
 Photo Gallery by Leonardo Bellotti 
 Parma on The Campanile Project

 
Cities and towns in Emilia-Romagna